"Here We Have Idaho" is the official state song of Idaho. The music was originally composed by Sallie Hume-Douglas for a song titled "Garden of Paradise," which Hume-Douglas copyrighted in 1915. In 1917, two students at the University of Idaho used the music for their entry in a campus song contest. McKinley Helm wrote a verse for the song,  and Alice Bessee adapted the "Garden of Paradise" music to fit. Under the title "Our Idaho," the song won the contest that year and eventually became the university's alma mater. The university later learned that Hume-Douglas had copyrighted the music, and obtained permission from her to continue using it for "Our Idaho."

In the meantime, Albert J. Tompkins, Director of Music in the Boise Public Schools, had written two additional verses for the song. These were combined with Helm's verse (used as a chorus) to form "Here We Have Idaho," which the Idaho Legislature designated as the Idaho state song in 1931.

Lyrics

References

External links
 
 Idaho Stat. § 67–4503

Idaho
Music of Idaho
1917 songs
Songs about Idaho